Daichin Tana is an ethnic Mongol singer-songwriter from Qinghai, China. She is the lead singer of the band HAYA.

Early life
Daichin Tana's mother was well known locally as a Mongol folk musician; she supported Daichin Tana's interest in music from a young age. Daichin Tana studied vocal performance at Minzu University of China in Beijing.

Career
Daichin Tana joined the band HAYA ('sometimes'  'band Haya') in 2006. The band produces world music, using Mongolian folk music as its basis.

Daichin Tana provided the lead vocals for HAYA's first album, Wolf Totem, released in 2008. Their second album Silent Sky was released in 2009 with the label Wind Music.  A special edition LP vinyl was released in 2015. In 2011, Daichin Tana released another album with HAYA, titled Migration. HAYA released another album in 2014 called Crazy Horse.

In 2016, Daichin Tana and HAYA participated in the fourth season of the musical talent show I Am a Singer. They were eliminated in the first round on 22 January.

Personal life
In June 2013, Daichin Tana married bandmate and founder of HAYA Zhang Quansheng.

Discography

HAYA
Wolf Totem (2008)
Silent Sky (2009)
Migration (2011)
Crazy Horse (2014)
Silent Sky (2015)
Link (2019)

References

1983 births
Living people
Chinese people of Mongolian descent
Singers from Qinghai
Folk musicians
21st-century Chinese women singers